Dunnia is a monotypic genus of flowering plants in the family Rubiaceae. The genus contains only one species, viz. Dunnia sinensis, which is endemic to Guangdong.

References

External links
Dunnia in the World Checklist of Rubiaceae

Monotypic Rubiaceae genera
Rubioideae